Aelay is a 2021 Indian Tamil-language comedy drama television film written and directed by Halitha Shameem, and produced by S. Sashikanth and Ramachandra of YNOT Studios while creative produced by Pushkar–Gayathri of Wallwatcher Films. Co-produced by Reliance Entertainment, The film stars Samuthirakani and Manikandan, and has music composed by Kaber Vasuki and Aruldev, with cinematography handled by Theni Eswar and editing done by Shameem and Raymond Derrick Crasta respectively.

The film was scheduled for theatrical release on 12 February 2021, but the producers later opted for a direct television premiere through Star Vijay on 28 February 2021 and internationally on Netflix on 5 March 2021.

Plot 

An unexpected life event forces a young man to reconsider the past and his opinions about his father, who was an ice-cream seller.

Cast 
 Samuthirakani as Muthukkutty and Sudhakar (Imbuttu Kanji)
 Manikandan as Parthi
 Madhumathi as Nachiya
 Deepa Shankar as village school teacher
Sana Udhyakumar as Parthi Elder sister

Production 
In May 2019, YNOT Studios announced their collaboration with director duo Pushkar-Gayathri's newly launched production studio Wallwatcher Films, for Halitha Shameem's new project titled as Aelay. Both the directors also joined the film's team as the creative director, with Shameem revealed that she had written the script nine years back, and was waiting for the right producer. She earlier worked as an assistant to Pushkar and Gayathri, whom agreed to produce the film after her narration. The film is touted to be a neo-realistic comedy set in rural areas, with the relationship dynamics between a father and son at its core. Shameem decided to rope in Samuthirakani and Manikandan, whom were a part of the director's Sillu Karuppatti (2019), essaying the roles of father and son, whereas the rest of the cast were non-actors from the village of Manjunayakanpatti in Dindigul district.

Principal photography of the film took place in Palani on 3 May 2019, where the makers planned to shoot the film in a single stretch. The shooting of the film was completed on 1 July 2019.

Soundtrack 

The film songs are composed by Kaber Vasuki and Aruldev. The original Background score is composed by Aruldev, as he earlier worked with Halitha Shameem in her debut film Poovarasam Peepee (2014). The soundtrack album features six songs with lyrics written by Kaber Vasuki, Halitha Shameem, M. K. Kadal Vendhan and K. Chitrasenan. The album was released by Sony Music on 1 February 2021.

Release 
The film was initially scheduled for a theatrical release in September 2019, but was postponed due to the post-production delays and COVID-19 pandemic. The official trailer of the film was released on the occasion of Republic Day, 26 January 2021 and the film's release date of 12 February 2021 was announced.

However, a day before the scheduled release, the makers withdrawn the plans for theatrical release and was further announced that the film will be aired directly through Star Vijay on 28 February 2021. It was revealed that the theatre owners and distributors issued a red card against the film's production house YNOT Studios, over the digital release of Dhanush's Jagame Thandhiram (2021), and stated that the distributors will not screen any of the upcoming films belonging to the production company. Also the exhibitors demand of an OTT premiere only after 30-days of its theatrical run was one of the decision that the makers went straight ahead for a television premiere. Irrespective of this, a special screening for the film was held on 25 February 2021 at Sathyam cinemas in Chennai.

After its television premiere, the film premiered through Netflix on 5 March 2021.

Reception 
M. Suganth of The Times of India called out "Aelay" as "a journey that leaves you with a smile even if the ride was sort of bumpy for some parts", giving 3 out of 5 stars for the film. Behindwoods called the film as a "delightful watch"; giving 3 out of 5, the review further stated "With an in-form Samuthirakani and a high humour quotient, Aelay will surprise you in ways you wouldn't expect it to". Avinash Ramachandran of Cinema Express also gave 3 out of 5, writing "The film stays afloat, courtesy its efficient humour, some good performances from the leads, and impressive music".

Sify called the film "a breezy feel-good drama", adding "it makes you smile in several places but it falls short due to the overstretched second half and climax.". Srinivasa Ramanujam from The Hindu noted "director Halitha Shameem’s latest offering lacks pace but the performances and characterisation make up for it." Despite criticising its lengthy pace, Haricharan Pudipeddi of Hindustan Times called Aelay as a "fun, sweet film that gets so much right about life in a small village and their tradition".

Reviewing for Film Companion, Baradwaj Rangan stated the film as watchable, despite its issues. He wrote "There’s always something fresh and interesting and “quirky” enough to match the score, like the father and son giving up a chase while halfway up a tree. But you wish Halitha had leaned one way and stayed that course".

References 

2021 comedy-drama films
2021 films
Indian comedy-drama films
Indian television films
2021 television films